Piet Steenbergen (28 November 1928 – 22 April 2010) was a Dutch professional footballer who played as a midfielder. Steenbergen made his debut at Feijenoord and also played for French club Le Havre AC. At Feijenoord he played a total of 229 matches in which he scored 25 times, divided over eleven seasons. He was born and died in Rotterdam.

References

External links
 Profile

1928 births
2010 deaths
Dutch footballers
Association football midfielders
Feyenoord players
Le Havre AC players
Ligue 1 players
Eredivisie players
Netherlands international footballers
Footballers from Rotterdam
Dutch expatriate footballers
Expatriate footballers in France
Dutch expatriate sportspeople in France
Deaths from brain cancer in the Netherlands